Apalɨ (Apal), or Emerum, is a Papuan language of Madang Province, Papua New Guinea. Akɨ and Acɨ are two dialects that are quite different from each other.

Phonology

Vowels

Evolution

Below are some reflexes of proto-Trans-New Guinea proposed by Pawley (2012).

Sources abbreviations
(W) = Wade (n.d.), Akɨ dialect
(Z) = Z’graggen (1980), Acɨ dialect

References

Sogeram languages
Languages of Madang Province